Banerjee or Bandyopadhyay is a surname of Brahmins originating from the Bengal region of the Indian subcontinent and from Bangladesh.

Lineage and ancestry
Banerjees are from the ancient Shandilya Gotra, which means all Banerjees are descended from Kannauj from the ancient sage Shandilya as per the Puranas. Together with Mukherjees, Chatterjees, Bhattacharjees and Gangulys, Banerjees form the Kulin Brahmins.

History

Notable people 
Notable people with the surname Banerjee, Bandopadhyay, or variations, include:

Alapan Bandyopadhyay, (born 1961) IAS Officer
Anjan Bandyopadhyay,  (1965 – 2021) journalist
 Abhijit Banerjee, (born 1961) Nobel laureate economist
 Albion Rajkumar Banerjee (1871 – 1950) an Indian civil servant and administrator
 Ambica Banerjee (1928 – 2013) a member of the 15th Lok Sabha.
 Audrish Banerjee (born 1975)  an Indian former cricketer.
 Bhanu Banerjee, (1920 – 1983) actor and freedom activist
 Bibhutibhushan Bandyopadhyay (1895 – 1950) was an Indian writer
 Bidisha Bandyopadhyay, (born1978) writer, broadcaster
 Chitra Banerjee Divakaruni (born 1956) Indian-born American author, poet, and professor.
 Dibakar Banerjee (born 1969) Indian film director, screenwriter, producer and advertisement-filmmaker.
 Dola Banerjee (born 1980) is an Indian sportswoman who competes in archery
 Gooroodas Banerjee, (1844 –1918) aka Gurudas Bandyopadhyay, Bengali Indian High Court judge
 Gopeshwar Banerjee (1880–1963) an Indian classical singer and musicologist, 
 Haradhan Bandopadhyay,  (1926 – 2013) a Bengali Indian actor
 Ishwar Chandra Bandyopadhyay (1820 –  1891)  Indian educator and social reformer
 Jenni Banerjee, (born 1981) Finnish actress with Indian ancestry.
 John Banerjee (1873 – ?) the second non-European bishop of the Church of India, Burma and Ceylon
 Kali Banerjee, actor
 Kali Charan Banerjee
 Kalyan Banerjee
 Kanika Bandyopadhyay (1924–2000), singer 
 Kanu Banerjee (1905–1985), actor (Pather Panchali)
 Karuna Banerjee (1919–2001), actress (Pather Panchali)
 Krishna Mohan Banerjee
 Kaushik Banerjee, actor
 Mamata Banerjee
 Manik Bandopadhyay, writer, novelist
 Nikhil Banerjee, composer, musician
 Nyra Banerjee, Indian television actress and assistant director.
 Pradip Kumar Banerjee
 Prith Banerjee
 Pooja Banerjee, television actress
 Puja Banerjee, film and television actress
 Rachana Banerjee, actor
 Raghab Bandyopadhyay, prose writer
 Rahul Banerjee, archer
 R D Banerji, The discoverer of Mohenjo-daro, the principal site of the Indus Valley Civilisation 
 Rina Banerjee
 Ruprekha Banerjee
 San Banarje, film director, producer, photographer
 Sanjay Banerjee, Indian engineer
 Shakuntala Banerjee (born 1973), German journalist
 Sharadindu Bandyopadhyay
 Sarnath Banerjee
 Somen Banerjee
 Surendranath Banerjee, first Indian to qualify Indian Civil Service Examination
 Sushmita Banerjee, writer 
 Syagnik Banerjee , scholar, author, and professor 
 Victor Banerjee, actor both in Tollywood, Bollywood and Hollywood
 Vikram Banerjee
 Gargi Banerji, cricketer
 Sara Banerji, writer
 Womesh Chunder Bonnerjee, first president of the Indian National Congress.

References

Brahmin communities
Social groups of West Bengal
Indian surnames
Hindu surnames
Bengali Hindu surnames
Kulin Brahmin surnames